A Zamindar (Hindustani: Devanagari: , ; Persian:) in the Indian subcontinent was an autonomous or semi-autonomous ruler of a province. The term itself came into use during the reign of Mughals and later the British had begun using it as a native synonym for “estate”. The term means Landowner in Persian. They were typically hereditary, and held the right to collect tax on behalf of imperial courts or for military purposes.
During the period of British colonial rule in India many wealthy and influential zamindars were bestowed with princely and royal titles such as Maharaja, Raja/Rai, Chaudhary, Nawab and Sardar.

During the Mughal Empire, zamindars belonged to the nobility and formed the ruling class. Emperor Akbar granted them mansabs and their ancestral domains were treated as jagirs. Some zamindars were Hindu by religion and Brahmin or Kayastha or Kshatriya by caste. During the colonial era, the Permanent Settlement consolidated what became known as the zamindari system. The British rewarded supportive zamindars by recognising them as princes. Many of the region's princely states were pre-colonial zamindar holdings elevated to a greater protocol. The British also reduced the land holdings of many pre-colonial princely states and chieftaincy, demoting their status to a zamindar from previously higher ranks of nobility.

The system was abolished during land reforms in East Pakistan (Bangladesh) in 1950, India in 1951 and West Pakistan in 1959.

The zamindars often played an important role in the regional histories of the subcontinent. One of the most notable examples is the 16th-century confederation formed by twelve zamindars in the Bhati region (Baro-Bhuyans), which, according to the Jesuits and Ralph Fitch, earned a reputation for successively repelling Mughal invasions through naval battles. The zamindars were also patrons of the arts. The Tagore family produced India's first Nobel laureate in literature in 1913, Rabindranath Tagore, who was often based at his estate. The zamindars also promoted neoclassical and Indo-Saracenic architecture.

Mughal era

They were vassals who ruled, mostly hereditarily, over their respective territories. They commanded not only a considerable part of the economic resources of the empire but also military power. After the conquest of Hindustan, Babur informs us that one-sixth of its total revenues came from the territories of the chiefs. He writes: "The revenue of the countries now held by me (1528 A.D.) from Bhira to Bihar, is fifty-two crores as will be known in detail. Eight or nine crores of this are from the parganas of rais and the rajas who have submitted in the past (to the Sultans of Delhi), receive allowance and maintenance."

According to Arif Qandhari, one of the contemporary historian of Akbar's reign, there were around two to three hundred rajas or rais and zamindars who ruled their territory from strong forts under the emperor's suzerainty. Each of these rajas and zamindars commanded an army of their own generally consisting of their clansmen and the total numbers of their troops as Abul Fazl tells us, stood at forty four lakhs comprising 384,558 cavalry, 4,277,057 infantry; 1863 elephants, 4260 guns and 4500 boats.
During the Mughal Era there was no clear difference between the princely states and zamindari estates. Even the ruling autonomous chiefs of princely states were called zamindars.
Moreland was one of the first historian who draw our attention to the importance of zamindars in medieval India. He defines zamindars as "vassal chiefs". He points out that there were areas under direct control of Mughals where there were no zamindars and then there were territories of the vassal chiefs who had autonomy over their state, but were subjugated by the Mughals and paid a tribute/ nazarana to the Mughal Emperor. However Irfan Habib in his book Agrarian system of Mughal India, divided the zamindars into two categories : the autonomous chiefs who enjoyed "sovereign power" in their territories and the ordinary zamindars who exercised superior rights in land and collected land revenue and were mostly appointed by the Mughals. These people were known as the zamindars (intermediaries) and they collected revenue primarily from the Ryots (peasants) The zamindari system was more prevalent in the north of India because Mughal influence in the south was less apparent.

Historian S. Nurul Hasan divided the zamindars into three categories: (i) The Autonomous Rai/ Rajas or Chiefs, (ii) the intermediary zamindars and (iii) the primary zamindars.

British era

The East India Company established themselves in India by first becoming zamindars of three villages of Calcutta, Sultani and Govindpur. Later they acquired the 24-Parganas and in 1765 got control of Bengal, Bihar and Orissa. Later in 1857 the British Crown was established as the sovereign.

During Mughal Era the zamindars were not proprietors. They used to engage in wars and used to plunder neighbouring kings. So they never looked after the improvements in their land. The East India Company under Lord Cornwallis, realising this, made Permanent Settlement in 1793 with the zamindars and made them proprietors of their land in return for a fixed annual rent and left them independent for the internal affairs of their estates. This Permanent Settlement created the new zamindari system as we know it today. After 1857 the army of the majority of zamindars were abolished with exception of a small number of force for policing/digwari/kotwali in their respective estates. If the zamindars were not able to pay the rent until sunset, parts of their estates were acquired and auctioned. This created a new class of zamindars in the society. As the rest of India came later under the control of the East India Company (EIC), different ways were implemented in different provinces to in regards to the ruling authorities in the region to get them to accede to Company authority.    
     
The British generally adopted the extant zamindari system of revenue collection in the north of the country. They recognised the zamindars as landowners and proprietors as opposed to Mughal government and in return required them to collect taxes. Although some zamindars were present in the south, they were not so in large numbers and the British administrators used the ryotwari (cultivator) method of collection, which involved selecting certain farmers as being land owners and requiring them to remit their taxes directly.

The Zamindars of Bengal were influential in the development of Bengal. They played pivotal part during the Indian Rebellion of 1857.

The British continued the tradition of bestowing both royal and noble titles to zamindars who were loyal to the paramount. The title of Raja, Maharaja, Rai Saheb, Rai Bahadur, Rao, Nawab, Khan Bahadur were bestowed to princely state rulers and to many zamindars from time to time. According to an estimate in the Imperial Gazetteer of India, there were around 2000 ruling chiefs holding the royal title of Raja and Maharaja which included the rulers of princely states and several large chiefdoms. This numbers increases tenfold if zamindar/ jagirdar chiefs with other non royal but noble title are taken into count.

Accession
Unlike the autonomous or frontier chiefs, the hereditary status of the zamindar class was circumscribed by the Mughals, and the heir depended to a certain extent on the pleasure of the sovereign. Heirs were set by descent or a times even adoption by religious laws. Under the British Empire, the zamindars were to be subordinate to the Crown and not act as hereditary lords, but at times family politics was at the heart of naming an heir. At times, a cousin could be named an heir with closer family relatives present; a lawfully wedded wife could inherit the zamindari if the ruling zamindar named her as an heir.

Abolition

The zamindari system was mostly abolished in independent India soon after its creation with the First Amendment of the Constitution of India which amended the right to property as shown in Articles 19 and 31. In Bangladesh, the East Bengal State Acquisition and Tenancy Act of 1950 had a similar effect of ending the system. Due to Zamindari system small farmers could not get financially strong.

In global health

Critics have likened the discipline of global health to a feudal structure where individuals and institutions in high-income nations act as zamindars over health issues of low-and-middle income nations, thus sustaining the imperial nature of global health.

See also
 Koli rebellions
 Indian feudalism
 Indian honorifics
 Jagirdar
 Ghatwals and Mulraiyats
 Mankari
 Maratha titles
 Thakur
 Zamindars of Bihar
 List of amendments of the Constitution of India

Notes

References

Mughal Empire
Titles in India
Titles in Bangladesh
Indian feudalism
Feudalism in Pakistan
Feudalism in Bangladesh
 Zam